そ, in hiragana, or ソ, in katakana, is one of the Japanese kana, each of which represents one mora.  Both represent . The version of this character used by computer fonts does not match the handwritten form that most native Japanese writers use. The native way is shown here as the alternative form.

Stroke order

Alternative form

Other communicative representations

 Full Braille representation

 Computer encodings

References
 The Compact Nelson Japanese-English Character Dictionary (Andrew Nelson, John H Haig) Tuttle Publishing 1999

Specific kana